Tugalina is a genus of sea snails, marine gastropod mollusks in the family Fissurellidae, the keyhole limpets and slit limpets.

Species
Species within the genus Tugalina include:
 Tugalina gigas (Martens, 1881)
Tugalina plana (Schepman, 1908)
Tugalina radiata Habe, 1953
Tugalina vadososinuata (Yokoyama, 1922)

References

 Habe, T. (1953). Pinnidae, Placunidae and Anomiidae in Japan. In: Kuroda, T. [ed] Illustrated Catalogue of Japanese Shells 24: 185–200.

External links
 To World Register of Marine Species

Fissurellidae
Monotypic gastropod genera